Qomish, Qomīsh, Qomesh, Komash, Kumāsh, Qamesh, Qamsh, or Qomāsh may refer to:

Qomesh, Kermanshah
Qomish, Lorestan